Tiger Adventure is a 1979 children's book by the Canadian-born American author Willard Price. In his "Adventure" series featuring characters Hal and Roger Hunt. It depicts an expedition to India to capture animals, including tigers, for a zoo. They encounter an annoying city boy, named Vic Stone, who is a constant pain to their travels. He blames everything on Hal and Roger, even when it is his fault.

The scene changes when they have a disastrous encounter on the Himalayas, where Vic has a life-threatening accident and changes his attitude completely for the better, even saving Hal's life.

1979 American novels
Novels by Willard Price
Novels set in India
Jonathan Cape books
1979 children's books
Books about tigers